Vĩnh Lợi is a rural district (huyện) of Bạc Liêu province in the Mekong Delta region of Vietnam. As of 2003 the district had a population of 187,515. The district covers an area of 652 km2. The district capital lies at Châu Hưng. Vĩnh Lợi district is north of the border with Sóc Trăng province, south of Hòa Bình and Bạc Liêu town, and west of Phước Long district.

Administrative divisions
Vĩnh Lợi district is subdivided into 8 commune-level subdivisions, including Châu Hưng township (district capital), and the rural communes of: Châu Hưng A, Hưng Thành, Hưng Hội, Châu Thới, Vĩnh Hưng, Vĩnh Hưng A and Long Thạnh.

References

Districts of Bạc Liêu province